The Maduru Oya Dam is an irrigation dam built across the Maduru Oya. The embankment dam measures  in length,  in height, and creates the Maduru Oya Reservoir.

See also 
 Maduru Oya National Park

References

External links 
 
 

Dams in Sri Lanka
Embankment dams